Dear Homeland (German: Teure Heimat) is a 1929 German silent comedy film directed by Carl Wilhelm and starring Renate Müller, Jakob Tiedtke and Hans Albers. The film's art direction was by Max Heilbronner. A German mechanic considers emigrating to the United States, but changes his mind when he falls in love with a local woman.

Cast
 Renate Müller as  Gretchen Jürgen 
 Jakob Tiedtke as Großvater von Gretchen    
 Hans Albers as Verbrecher / Chefingenieur Orginsky? 
 Hans Brausewetter as Karl Alder 
 Annemarie Steinsieck
 Fritz Schulz   
 Bruno Ziener
 Paul Westermeier   
 Henry Bender   
 Hugo Werner-Kahle   
 Lotte Werkmeister   
 Else Reval as Zimmervermieterin 
 Iwa Wanja

References

Bibliography
Prawer, S.S. Between Two Worlds: The Jewish Presence in German and Austrian Film, 1910–1933. Berghahn Books, 2005.

External links

1929 films
Films of the Weimar Republic
1929 comedy films
German silent feature films
German comedy films
Films directed by Carl Wilhelm
German black-and-white films
Silent comedy films
1920s German films
1920s German-language films